The 1986 English cricket season was the 87th in which the County Championship had been an official competition. Essex won the title for the third time in four seasons. England were defeated in both their Test series against New Zealand and India.

Honours
County Championship - Essex
NatWest Trophy - Sussex
Sunday League - Hampshire
Benson & Hedges Cup - Middlesex
Minor Counties Championship - Cumberland
MCCA Knockout Trophy - Norfolk
Second XI Championship - Lancashire II 
Wisden - John Childs, Graeme Hick, Dilip Vengsarkar, Courtney Walsh, James Whitaker

Test series

New Zealand tour

India tour

Zimbabwe visit
The Zimbabwe national cricket team made a short visit to England and played a single limited overs match against Northamptonshire, the county winning by 7 wickets.

County Championship

NatWest Trophy

Benson & Hedges Cup

Sunday League

Rest of the World team
The Rest of the World XI played a one-day versus a West Indies XI for the Sport Aid charity at Edgbaston Cricket Ground in Birmingham. The match was a no result due to rain.

References

Annual reviews
 Playfair Cricket Annual 1987
 Wisden Cricketers' Almanack 1987

English cricket seasons in the 20th century
English Cricket Season, 1986
Cricket season